Aulacogenia is a genus within the subfamily Stenopodainae of Reduviidae. 19 species have been described, including 5 from China.

Partial list of species

Aulacogenia corniculata Stål
Aulacogenia zhangi Wang, 2008

References

Reduviidae
Endemic fauna of China